Stephen P. Marks is an American scientist who is currently the François-Xavier Bagnoud Professor of Health and Human Rights at Harvard T.H. Chan School of Public Health.

References

Year of birth missing (living people)
Living people
Harvard University faculty
Harvard University alumni
Stanford University alumni
American scientists